The Vermeule Mansion, also known as the Van Derventer–Brunson House, is a historic house located at 614 Greenbrook Road in North Plainfield in Somerset County, New Jersey. The building was added to the National Register of Historic Places on October 27, 2004, for its significance in architecture from 1870 to 1911.

History
In 1835, John Vermeule sold the farm property at this site to Jeremiah R. Van Derventer (1809–1889). This house was probably started , with a second building phase . Van Derventer's grandson, Augustus J. Brunson (1870–1963), inherited the property and made further renovations . The house shows both Second Empire and Colonial Revival architectural styles. It now serves as the Vermeule Community Center for North Plainfield.

Since 1985, the house has been used by The Fleetwood Museum of Art and Photographica to exhibit the camera collection of Benjamin Fleetwood and the oil paintings by his wife, Matilda Fleetwood.

See also
 National Register of Historic Places listings in Somerset County, New Jersey
 List of museums in New Jersey

References

External links
 
 

North Plainfield, New Jersey
Houses in Somerset County, New Jersey
National Register of Historic Places in Somerset County, New Jersey
New Jersey Register of Historic Places
Second Empire architecture in New Jersey
Colonial Revival architecture in New Jersey
Museums in Somerset County, New Jersey